Events of the year 1909 in the Brazil.

Incumbents

Federal government
President: Afonso Pena (until 14 June); Nilo Peçanha (starting 14 June) 
Vice President: Nilo Peçanha (until 14 June); vacant (starting 14 June)

Governors 
 Alagoas: 
 till 3 March: Euclid Vieira Malta
 3 March-12 June: José Miguel de Vasconcelos
 from 12 June: Euclid Vieira Malta
 Amazonas: Antônio Clemente Ribeiro Bittencourt
 Bahia: João Ferreira de Araújo Pinho
 Ceará: Antônio Nogueira Accioli
 Goiás:
 until March 11: Miguel da Rocha Lima
 March 11 - May 1: Francisco Bertoldo de Sousa
 May 1 - July 24: José da Silva Batista
 From July 24: Urbano Coelho de Gouveia
 Maranhão:
 until February 25: Arthur Collares
 February 25 - June 29: Mariano Martins Lisboa Neto
 from June 29: Américo Vespúcio dos Reis
 Mato Grosso: Pedro Celestino Corrêa da Costa
 Minas Gerais: 
 until 3 April: Júlio Bueno Brandão
 from 3 April: Venceslau Brás
 Pará:
 until 1 February: Augusto Montenegro
 from 1 February: João Antônio Luís Coelho
 Paraíba: João Lopes Machado
 Paraná: Francisco Xavier da Silva
 Pernambuco: Herculano Bandeira de Melo
 Piauí:
 until 5 December: Anísio Auto de Abreu
 from 5 December: Manuel Raimundo da Paz
 Rio Grande do Norte: Alberto Maranhão 
 Rio Grande do Sul: Carlos Barbosa Gonçalves
 Santa Catarina:
 São Paulo: 
 Sergipe:

Vice governors 
 Rio Grande do Norte:
 São Paulo:

Events

20 January - Brazil's new cruiser, Bahia, is launched.
19 April - Brazil's new battleship, São Paulo, is launched at Barrow-in-Furness, UK, by Regis de Oliveira, the wife of Brazil's minister to Great Britain. 
17 May - The football club Paulista Futebol Clube is founded.

Births
21 February - Mário Wallace Simonsen, businessman (died 1965)
4 August - Roberto Burle Marx, landscape architect (died 1994)
13 September - Prince Pedro Henrique of Orléans-Braganza, claimant to the abolished imperial throne of Brazil (in France; died 1981). 
26 September - Geraldo de Proença Sigaud, Archbishop of Diamantina 1960-1980 (died 1999)
21 November - Octacílio Pinheiro Guerra, footballer (died 1967)

Deaths
6 March - João Barbosa Rodrigues, botanist and engineer (born 1842)
14 June - Afonso Pena, lawyer and politician, President of Brazil (born 1847)
15 August - Euclides da Cunha, journalist, sociologist and engineer (born 1866)
27 November - Prince Luigi, Count of Roccaguglielma, son of Princess Januária of Brazil (born 1845)

References

See also 
1909 in Brazilian football

 
1900s in Brazil
Brazil
Years of the 20th century in Brazil